Zhu Xingliang (born 1959) is a Chinese entrepreneur, the founder of Suzhou Gold Mantis Construction Decoration, an interior design and decoration company.

Early life
Zhu was born in 1959, and graduated from Suzhou University of Science and Technology in 1987.

Career
Zhu founded Suzhou Gold Mantis Construction Decoration, an interior design and decoration company.

Personal life
He is married with one child and lives in Suzhou, China.

References

1959 births
Living people
Billionaires from Jiangsu
Businesspeople from Suzhou
Chinese company founders